Patricia Bean McConnell Ph.D, CAAB Emeritus  (Née Patricia Bean) was born November 16, 1948. She
is an Ethologist who consulted with pet dog and cat owners for over thirty years regarding
serious behavioral problems, has given seminars on companion animal behavior both
domestically and internationally, and has written several books on training and behavior relating
to their dogs. She has been invited to speak all over the world about canine behavior and
training.

McConnell taught "The Biology and Philosophy of Human/Animal Relationships" in the
Department of Integrative Biology (formerly the Department of Zoology) for twenty-five years
at the University of Wisconsin-Madison, and remains a sought-out expert in the field of animal
behavior.

Her nationally published books include The Other End of the Leash (published by Ballintine Books and is available in 13 languages ), and her memoir The Education of Will (published by Simon and Schuster). Her book, For the Love of a Dog, went on to win an Audie award for the audiobook in 2007. She has also produced a number of pet training DVDs. 

In both her academic and popular writing she has focused on issues of interspecies communication.

She also runs her own publishing company, McConnell Publishing.

She retired from the University of Wisconsin-Madison in May 2015.

Early life and education
McConnell was born in Phoenix, Arizona in 1948.  She is the youngest of three siblings. Her sisters are Liza Piatt of Thousand Oaks, CA, and the poet Wendy Barker of San Antonio, TX.

McConnell is a trained ethologist, a Certified Applied Animal Behaviorist (see Association for the Study of Animal Behaviour), and received her Ph.D. in Zoology from the University of Wisconsin-Madison in 1988. Her doctoral dissertation, "Acoustic structure and receiver response in mammalian signal systems", won the Warder Clyde Allee competition the same year. The W.C. Allee award  is presented to a student in a juried competition who demonstrated the best presentation of ethological research.

Animal Behavior Career
The same year she earned her Ph.D., McConnell founded Dog’s Best Friend, Ltd. with her business partner, Nancy Raffetto. For 30 years, McConnell used her expertise and education to help people understand their dog's behaviors. The business started as the duo using their knowledge of animal behavior to help people address serious behavior problems in dogs. What was unique about their methods as they were the only animal behavior practitioners of positive reinforcement in the area, a technique that was considered "unconventional" at the time.

When McConnell retired, she sold Dog’s Best Friend Training, LLC, which is now owned and operated by Aimee Moore of Madison, WI. The website still notes Patricia McConnell in the footer: "Dog’s Best Friend Training, founded in 1988 by Patricia McConnell, Ph.D., is dedicated to enriching the lives of dogs and their owners through dog training using positive reinforcement-based techniques. Our dog training classes help owners understand and humanely influence their dogs’ behavior," something McConnell has spoken frequently about in her presentations over the years.

In 2017, the Association of Professional Dog Trainers (the largest professional dog training/canine behavior community in the world) awarded Dr. McConnell a lifetime achievement award for "outstanding contributions to the association and the dog training industry" throughout her career.

Radio
From 1994 to 2008, McConnell was the co-host of the weekly one-hour radio show, "Calling All Pets", which was produced by Wisconsin Public Radio. For over 500 episodes, Dr. McConnell professionally and empathetically dispensed advice to a national audience about canine behavior problems and information about animal behavior research. The syndicated show played in more than 110 cities for fourteen years. Hosts McConnell and Larry Meiller's partnership started when McConnell was promoting a herding dog trial on Meiller's daily radio show, which was very popular. A producer asked if she'd consider coming on more frequently to talk about animal behavior, and eventually, "Calling All Pets" hit the airwaves.

Articles
McConnell was the behavior columnist for The Bark Magazine, a popular magazine addressing dog culture, ownership, canine news and pet ownership. The Bark Magazine was absorbed by "The Wildest", a site dedicated to addressing the health, behavior and lifestyle of pets. She was also a consulting editor for the Journal of Comparative Psychology

Talks and Educational Presentations
On November 11, 2017, Dr. McConnell participated in the internal presentation series, Talks at Google, which has hosted leaders in the fields of music, science, literature, sports, entertainment and more. Her presentation for Google, "The Not So Secret Life of Dogs", translates the visual signals dogs frequently use to communicate that many humans often misread.

Selected bibliography

 (Published in 12 languages)
 (Audie Award, as the Best Audio Book of 2007)

References

External links
 Author's website
 McConnell Publishing via Dogwise
Dog's Best Friend Training Center
Encyclopedia.com
 Calling All Pets website
 Madison Magazine website
 The Bark Website - archive
 Simon and Schuster
 The Not So Secret Lives of Dogs via Talks at Google

American columnists
American non-fiction writers
Ethologists
Living people
University of Wisconsin–Madison College of Letters and Science alumni
American women columnists
1948 births
American women non-fiction writers
21st-century American women
Zoologists